is a Japanese voice actor and singer. He was affiliated with 81 Produce before he became a freelancer in June 2013. He set up his own agency, Zynchro, in July 2014.

Since 2010, Kakihara has been affiliated with Kiramune, a music label by Bandai Visual and Lantis, where he debuted as a singer with his first mini album, Still on Journey. His first single, "String of Pain", released on 6 February 2013, is the ending theme song to the anime Hakkenden: Eight Dogs of the East in which he voiced Shino Inuzuka. He has released two full albums, five mini albums, and six singles. His third single, "咲いちゃいな (Saichaina)", was released on 15 April 2015.

Kakihara is well known for voicing roles as young boys with fiery personalities, like Natsu Dragneel from the anime Fairy Tail. He is well-known for voice acting in otome games, such as voicing Shin in the PSP game series Amnesia and K1-B0 from Danganronpa V3: Killing Harmony. Kakihara is also active in BL (boys' love) Drama CDs and anime.

Biography
Kakihara was fascinated by Japanese entertainment culture and decided to become a voice actor. In 2001, Kakihara went to the Amusement Media Academy (a vocational school for voice actors and artists) to study voice acting. While attending courses, he worked part-time jobs, and improved his Japanese through part-time school. He debuted as a professional voice actor in 2003.

He was nominated for the "Best Male Newcomer/Rookie" award for his performance at the first Seiyu Awards in 2007.

Filmography

Anime
2003
Monkey Typhoon (Announcer)

2004
Doki Doki School Hours (Koro-chan)
Nepos Napos (Timo)

2005
Ah! My Goddess (Male Student)
Fushigiboshi no Futagohime (Bright)
Magical Girl Lyrical Nanoha A's (Lævateinn, Graf Eisen, Landy/Randy(Operator B), Sand Dragon)

2006
Ah! My Goddess: Flights of Fancy (Male Student)
Black Lagoon (Rico, Ronnie, Ricardo)
Fushigiboshi no Futagohime Gyu! (Bright)
Kirarin Revolution (Toriya Kamiyama (ep 2))
Princess Princess (Yutaka Mikoto)

2007
Dragonaut: The Resonance (Kazuki Tachibana)
Magical Girl Lyrical Nanoha StrikerS (Lævateinn, Graf Eisen, Strada, Lat Cartos)
Minami-ke (Fujioka)
Prism Ark (Hyaweh)
Romeo x Juliet (Mercutio)
Tengen Toppa Gurren Lagann (Simon)
Zombie-Loan (Lyca)
Claymore (Orphelia's Brother)

2008
Ga-Rei Zero (Masaki Shindou)
Kannagi (Meguru Akiba)
Kirarin Revolution Stage 3 (Nii-kun)
Linebarrels of Iron (Kouichi Hayase)
Nabari no Ō (Sōrō Katō)
Pokémon: Diamond and Pearl (Reggie)

2009
Bleach (Ggio Vega, Shinji)
Cross Game (Mizuki Asami)
Fairy Tail (Natsu Dragneel)
Fullmetal Alchemist: Brotherhood (Kain Fuery)
Hanasakeru Seishōnen (Toranosuke V Haga)
Shangri-La (Medusa)
Metal Fight Beyblade (Hyōma)

2010
Battle Spirits Brave (Youth Glynnhorn)
Hime Chen! Otogi Chikku Idol Lilpri aka. Lilpri (Wish/Chris)
Kaichou wa Maid-sama (Gouki Aratake)
Nura: Rise of the Yokai Clan (Jiro Shima)

2011
Ao no Exorcist (Amaimon)
C (anime) (Kou Sennoza)
Copihan (Omoto Kumogiri)
Digimon Xros Wars: Time Traveling Hunter Boys (Ryōma Mogami)
Dog Days (Gaul Galette des Rois)
Fairy Tail (Natsu Dragneel, Natsu Dragion)
HIGH SCORE (Tokiwazu Jiro)
Moshidora (Keiichirō Asano)
Nura: Rise of the Yokai Clan: Demon Capital (Jiro Shima)
Sengoku Paradise Kiwami (Date Masamune: refer to 'popular culture section')
Sket Dance (Masafumi Usui)
Toriko (Tom)

2012
Brave10 (Sarutobi Sasuke)
Detective Conan (Sumio Tateno (ep 665))
Dog Days’ (Gaul Galette des Rois)
K (Colorless King, Adolf K. Weismann)
Mobile Suit Gundam AGE (Deen Anon)
Ozuma (Sam Coyne)
Saint Seiya Omega (Ryūhō)
Smile PreCure! (Brian Taylor (ep 36))

2013
Amnesia (Shin)
BlazBlue Alter Memory (Jin Kisaragi, Hakumen)
Hakkenden: Tōhō Hakken Ibun (Shino Inuzuka)
Kamisama no Inai Nichiyōbi (Kiriko Zubreska)
Magi: The Kingdom of Magic (Kouha Ren)
Makai Ouji: Devils and Realist (Camio)
Minami-ke: Tadaima (Fujioka)
Pretty Rhythm: Rainbow Live (Kōji Mihama)
Servant x Service (Jōji Tanaka)
Yowamushi Pedal (Toudou Jinpachi)
A Simple Thinking About Blood Type (Type AB-kun)

2014
Baby Steps (Takuya Miyagawa)
Bonjour♪Sweet Love Patisserie (Mitsuki Aoi)
Fairy Tail (Natsu Dragneel)
The File of Young Kindaichi Returns (Fūma Kamioka (ep 6~9))
Fūun Ishin Dai Shogun (Keiichirō Tokugawa)
Garo: The Animation (Pepe)
Hōzuki no Reitetsu (Karauri)
Log Horizon 2 (Rundelhaus Code)
M3: Sono Kuroki Hagane (Minashi Maki)
One Piece (Gardoa)
Shōnen Hollywood (Ikuma Amaki)
Tokyo ESP (Shindō Masaki)
Yowamushi Pedal (Toudou Jinpachi)

2015
Baby Steps Season 2 (Takuya Miyagawa)
Beautiful Bones: Sakurako's Investigation (Haruto Imai)
Dog Days (Gaul Galette des Rois)
Himouto! Umaru-chan (Alex Tachibana)
Rin-ne (Masato, Boxer(ep25))
Saekano: How to Raise a Boring Girlfriend (Iori Hashima)
Show by Rock!! (Yaiba)
Sky Wizards Academy (Lloyd Allwin)
Yu-Gi-Oh! Arc-V (Dennis Macfield)
Magical Girl Lyrical Nanoha Vivid (Landy, Lat Cartos)
Minna Atsumare! Falcom Gakuen (Lloyd Bannings)

2016
Puzzle & Dragons Cross (Lance)
Fairy Tail Zero (Natsu Dragneel (ep 1, 11, and 12))
Divine Gate (Akane)
Ojisan to Marshmallow (Isamu Wakabayashi)
Prince of Stride: Alternative (Amatsu Ida)
12-sai: Chicchana Mune no Tokimeki (Ayumu Tsutsumi)
B-Project: Kodou*Ambitious (Momotarou Onzai)
Show by Rock!! Short!! (Yaiba)
Show by Rock!!♯ (Yaiba)
World Trigger (Yuiga Takeru)
Tsukiuta. The Animation (You Haduki)
Handa-kun (Reo Nikaido)
Mobile Suit Gundam Unicorn RE:0096 (Angelo Sauper)
Concrete Revolutio: The Last Song (Ganba)
Touken Ranbu: Hanamaru (Uguisumaru)
Soul Buster (Barin Yi)
Nanbaka (Uno)
Occultic;Nine (Shun Moritsuka)
Servamp (Mikuni Alicein)

2017
Nanbaka 2 (Uno)
Yowamushi Pedal: New Generation (Toudou Jinpachi)
Kenka Bancho Otome: Girl Beats Boys (Yuta Mirako)
Time Bokan 24 (Sōji Okita)
Code: Realize − Guardian of Rebirth (Victor Frankenstein)
UQ Holder! Magister Negi Magi! 2 (Ikkuu Ameya)
Dynamic Chord (Seri Yuisaki)
Sengoku Night Blood (Kanetsugu Naoe)
Kakuriyo: Bed and Breakfast for Spirits (Hideyoshi)

2018
Doraemon (Hodoho)
100 Sleeping Princes & the Kingdom of Dreams (Marchia)
Yowamushi Pedal: Glory Line (Toudou Jinpachi)
Puzzle & Dragons (Dragon)
Layton Mystery Tanteisha: Katori no Nazotoki File (Frederic Morden)
Muhyo & Roji's Bureau of Supernatural Investigation (Yoichi Himukai)
Hinomaru Sumo (Takuya Terahara)
Fairy Tail (Season 8) (Natsu Dragneel)
Million Arthur (also 2019) (Tekken Arthur)

2019
B-Project: Zecchō Emotion (Momotarou Onzai)
Namu Amida Butsu!: Rendai Utena (Dainichi Nyorai)
Ensemble Stars! (Subaru Akehoshi)
Arifureta: From Commonplace to World's Strongest (Kōki Amanogawa)
Carole & Tuesday (Aaron)
Stand My Heroes: Piece of Truth (Tsukasa Asagiri)
Welcome to Demon School! Iruma-kun Season 1 (Andro M. Jazz)

2020
Show by Rock!! Mashumairesh!! (Yaiba (ep 7))
My Next Life as a Villainess: All Routes Lead to Doom! (Keith Claes)
Muhyo & Roji's Bureau of Supernatural Investigation Season 2 (Yōichi Himukai)
Boruto: Naruto Next Generations (Deepa)
Gibiate (Sensui Kanzaki)
Mr Love: Queen's Choice (Kira (Kiro))
A3! Season Autumn & Winter (Azuma Yukishiro)
Tsukiuta. The Animation 2 (You Haduki)

2021
Hortensia Saga (Leon D. Olivier)
I-Chu: Halfway Through the Idol (Mio Yamanobe)
Show by Rock!! Stars!! (Yaiba)
Log Horizon: Destruction of the Round Table (Rundelhaus Code)
Those Snow White Notes (Taketo)
My Next Life as a Villainess: All Routes Lead to Doom! X (Keith Claes)
Welcome to Demon School! Iruma-kun Season 2 (Andro M. Jazz)

2022
Salaryman's Club (Kōki Takeda)
Aharen-san wa Hakarenai (Ishikawa)
Love All Play (Yōji Higashiyama)
Heroines Run the Show (Megu)
Tomodachi Game (Chisato Hashiratani)
Cap Kakumei Bottleman DX (Haku Kurenai)
Welcome to Demon School! Iruma-kun Season 3 (Andro M. Jazz)

2023
Chillin' in My 30s After Getting Fired from the Demon King's Army (Gashita)
My Hero Academia 6 (En)

TBA
Fairy Tail: 100 Years Quest (Natsu Dragneel)

Original net animation (ONA)
Xam'd: Lost Memories (2008) (Shiroza)
Brotherhood: Final Fantasy XV (2016) (Prompto Argentum)
The King of Fighters: Destiny (2017) (Matt)

Original video animation (OVA)
Angel's Feather (Kyouhei Mitsugi)
Black Jack Final – Karte 11 (Matsunojo)
Corpse Party Missing Footage (Sakutarō Morishige)
Corpse Party Tortured Souls (Sakutarō Morishige)
Disgaea 5: Alliance of Vengeance (Zeroken)
Fairy Tail OVA (Natsu Dragneel)
Finder Series (Akihito Takaba)
Minami-ke: Omatase (Fujioka)
Mobile Suit Gundam: The Origin (Garma Zabi)
Mobile Suit Gundam Unicorn (Angelo Sauper)
My-Otome 0~S.ifr~ (Kid)
Saint Seiya: The Lost Canvas (Pegasus Tenma)
The New Prince of Tennis (Liliadent Krauser)
The Prince of Tennis OVA (Liliadent Krauser)

Special
Million Arthur: Farewell, Beloved Dancho (2019), (Tekken Arthur)

Films
Naruto Shippuden: The Movie (2007) (Kusuna)
Vexille (2007) (Taro)
Gurren Lagann The Movie: Childhood's End (2008) (Simon)
Kara no Kyōkai: Paradox Paradigm Chapter 5 (2008) (Tomoe Enjō)
Gurren Lagann The Movie: The Lights in the Sky are Stars (2009) (Simon)
Kowarekake no Orgel (2009) (Keiichirō)
Magical Girl Lyrical Nanoha The Movie 1st (2010) (Landy/Randy)
Toriko 3D: Kaimaku! Gourmet Adventure!! (2011) (Tom)
Fairy Tail the Movie: The Phoenix Priestess (2012) (Natsu Dragneel)
Magical Girl Lyrical Nanoha The Movie 2nd A's (2012) (Landy/Randy, Lævateinn, and Graf Eisen)
Fairy Tail Movie 2: Dragon Cry (2017) (Natsu Dragneel)
Servamp -Alice in the Garden- (2018) (Mikuni Alicein)
Saekano the Movie: Finale (2019) (Iori Hashima)

Video games

A3! (Azuma Yukishiro)
Akane-sasu Sekai de Kimi to Utau (Nagakura Shinpachi)
Akiba's Trip Series (PSP) (Yuu Abeno)
Akiba's Trip
Akiba's Trip Plus
Amnesia Series (PSP) (Shin)
Amnesia
Amnesia Later
Amnesia Crowd
Atelier Iris: Eternal Mana (Klein Kiesling)
Atelier Iris 3: Grand Phantasm (Alvero Kronie/ Bersizel Krone)
BlazBlue Series (Jin Kisaragi/Hakumen/Alternate Announcer)
BlazBlue: Calamity Trigger
BlazBlue: Continuum Shift
BlazBlue: Continuum Shift II
BlazBlue: Continuum Shift Extend
BlazBlue: Chrono Phantasma
BlazBlue: Central Fiction
BlazBlue: Cross Tag Battle (Jin Kisaragi/ Hakumen)
Code: Realize − Guardian of Rebirth (Victor Frankenstein)
Code: Realize ~Future Blessings~
Code: Realize ~Bouquet of Rainbows~
Code: Realize ~Wintertide Miracles~
Cookie Run: Kingdom (Lilac Cookie)
Corpse Party Series (Sakutarō Morishige)
Corpse Party BloodCovered: ...Repeated Fear
Corpse Party: Book of Shadows
Corpse Party: The Anthology: Sachiko's Game of Love Hysteric Birthday 2U
Corpse Party: Blood Drive
Danganronpa V3: Killing Harmony (K1-B0)
Disgaea 5: Alliance of Vengeance (Zeroken)
Dynasty Warriors Series (Zhu Ran)
Dynasty Warriors 8: Xtreme Legends
Dynasty Warriors 8: Empires
Dynasty Warriors 9
Ensemble Stars! (Akehoshi Subaru)
"Exorcism of Maria" Series (Klaus (Kurausu Eaharuto))
Exorcism of Maria (PC)
Exorcism of Maria: La Campanella (PSP)
Fairy Tail Series (Natsu Dragneel)
Fairy Tail Story: Dark Guild Battle! (DS)
Fairy Tail Original Story: 2
Fairy Tail Portable Guild (PSP)
Fairy Tail Portable Guild 2
Fairy Tail Portable Guild 3: Zeref's Awakening
Final Fantasy XV (Prompto Argentum)
Fushigi Yūgi: Suzaku Ibun (Amiboshi and Suboshi)
Garnet Cradle PSP (Sairenji Rihito)
Gate of Nightmares (Manatsu)
 Genshin Impact (Scaramouche / Wanderer)
Genso Suikoden Tierkreis NDS (Riu /Liu)
Granblue Fantasy Mobile/Browser/PC (Elmott)
Hero's Park iOS/Android (Saienji Ryo)
Hoshizora no Komikku Gāden NDS (Kasudisu Koichi)
Houkago wa Gin no Shirabe PS2/PC (Izumi Yuuto)
I-Chu (Mio Yamanobe)
Last Ranker PSP (Bayger)
Lord of Vermilion Re:2 – Arcade (Jin Kisaragi)
Lost Dimension (Agito Yuuki)
Love Root Zero: KissKiss☆Labyrinth PS2 (Kuroe Kazuya)
Mabinogi (Starlet/Aria: Male)
Mahjong Soul (Ein, Usumi Ishihara)
Majou Ou (Melvin)
Mega Man Star Force 3 (A.C.Eos/Ace)
Mega Man Zero 4 (Fenri Lunaedge)
Mr Love: Queen's Choice (Kiro / Zhou Qiluo / Kira)
Onmyōji (Kisei)
Phantasy Star Online 2 (Huey/Hans/Light/Elly/Quna fan/Male Extra Voice 01/Male Extra Voice 20/Male Extra Voice 21/Male Extra Voice 32)
Psychedelica of the Black Butterfly PS Vita (Karasuba)
Tokimeki Restaurant (Tsuji Kaito)
"Renai Bancho" Series (PSP) (The Little Devil Banchou)
Renai Bancho: Inochi Meishi, Koiseyo Otome! Love is Power
Renai Bancho 2: Midnight Lesson!!!
ROOT∞REXX: PlayStation®Vita (Aki Hasumi, Akineko)
SD Gundam series (Angelo Sauper, Roche Nattono)
Seiken Densetsu 4 PS2 (Eldy)
Shin Gundam Musou (Angelo Sauper)
Shiratsuyu no Kai (Shima Takaomi)
Solatorobo: Red the Hunter – NDS (Red Savarin)
Stand My Heroes (iOS/Android) (Tsukasa Asagiri)
Super Robot Wars series (Kouichi Hayase, Simon, Angelo Sauper)
'Tales of' series (Shing Meteoryte)
Tales of Hearts (DS)
Tales of the World: Radiant Mythology 3 (PSP)
Tales of the Heroes: Twin Brave
Tales of Hearts R (PS Vita)
Tengen Toppa Gurren Lagann DS (Simon)
Trails series (Lloyd Bannings)
The Legend of Heroes: Trails from Zero (PSP, PC)
The Legend of Heroes: Trails to Azure (PSP, PC)
The Legend of Heroes: Trails of Cold Steel II (PS Vita, PC, PS4)
The Legend of Heroes: Trails of Cold Steel IV (PS4)
The Legend of Heroes: Trails into Reverie (PS4)
TSUKINO PARADISE (You Haduki)
TSUKINO PARK (You Haduki)
TSUKINO WORLD (You Haduki)
Tsukitomo。-TSUKIUTA.12 memories- (You Haduki)
CR Virtua Fighter (Lion Rafale)
Wand of Fortune Series (PSP/PS2) (Lagi El Nagil)
Wand of Fortune: Mirai e no Prologue (Prologue to the future)
Wand of Fortune 2: Jikuu ni Shizumu Mokujiroku (Revelation sink into the space-time)
Wand of Fortune 2 FD 〜君に捧げるエピローグ
Warriors Orochi 4 (Zhu Ran)
World Flipper (Hopper)
Zettai Meikyuu Grimm (Akazukin)
Illusion Connect (Ludwig)

Drama CDs

Anime/Game
Amnesia (Shin)
BlazBlue Series – Vol. 1 to Vol. 3 (Jin Kisaragi/Hakumen)
Dog Days (Gaul Galette des Rois)
Iris Zero (Toru Mizushima)
Kaichou wa Maid-sama (Ikuto Sarashina)
Ranobe Ouji☆Seiya (Kazuma)
Rockin' Heaven (Kido)
Sengoku Paradise Kiwami Series – Vol. 1 and Vol. 2 (Date Masamune)
Tales of Hearts series – Vol. 1 to Vol. 5 (Shing Meteoryte)
Trails series (Lloyd Bannings)

Otome/Original
Amnesia (Shin)
Amnesia: ～冥土の国のアムネシア～
Amnesia: Amnesia of the Dead
Bad Medicine -Infectious Teachers- (Kashu Remu)
Code:Realize ~Sousei no Himegimi~ as Victor Frankenstein
Jooubachi no Oubou - Kougou Hen (Rin)
Ketsuekigata Danshi/ Choose your favourite Blood Type boy! (Kurosaki Miyabi) as AB Type
Koisuru Lesson Series "Ayumu Kunishiro no Happy Lesson" (Ayumu Kunishiro)
 "Love Root Zero" Series (Kuroe Kazuya)
ラブルートゼロ: 失恋と嘘、迷子な僕ら。
ラブルートゼロ Do you love me? ラブ√1/2
ラブルートゼロ サヨナラと言えない僕らは...
ラブルートゼロ Do you wanna kiss me? ラブ√1/3
Perabu! A Cappella Love?! (Chihiro Mitsunaga)
"Renai Bancho 2" Sweet Sweet Birthday!!! (The Little Devil Banchou)
Samurai Drive (Takahara Ibuki)
Shiratsuyu no Kai (Shima Takaomi)
Vanquish Brothers (Shingen)
"Wand of Fortune" Series (Lagi El Nagil)
Wand of Fortune: ～狙われた予告状～ (The Targeted notice letter)
Wand of Fortune: ～ちいさなまほうのものがたり～ (The story of a little magic)
Wand of Fortune: ～ルルのいない朝～
Wand of Fortune 2: "巡り会えた奇跡"
Wand of Fortune 2: "歓迎！ミルス・クレア病院" (Welcome! Mills Clare Hospital)
Wand of Fortune 2 FD: "７つの時空でパパといっしょ！"
Zoku Fushigi Kobo Shokogun Episode7 as himself/narrator
Mr. Love: Dream Date (Kiro)

BL Drama CDs
Akanai Tobira (あかないとびら) (Masuoka)
Dekiru Otoko no sodate kata (デキる男の育て方) Vol. 1 and Vol. 2 (Kazuha)
Finder Series (Akihito Takaba)
One Wing in the Finder (ファインダーの隻翼)
Target in the Finder (ファインダーの標的) from Be-Boygold magazine special Drama CD Animix Anime OVA
Hidoku Shinaide'Treat Me Gently' (酷くしないで) (Nemugasa Takashi)
Honey Boys Spiral (ハニーボーイズ　スパイラル) (Hiro Nakanishi)
Honto Yajuu (ほんと野獣) Vol. 1, 2 and 3 (Aki Gotouda)
Houkago wa Dokusen Yoku (放課後は独占欲) (Kouji Yaegashi)
Iro Otoko (彩おとこ) (Ai Ishikawa)
Iro Otoko ~Kyoudai Hen~ (彩おとこ~兄弟篇~) (Ai Ishikawa)
Migawari Ouji no Junai (身代わり王子の純愛) (Hikaru)
Omake no Ouji Sama (オマケの王子様) (Rio Takatsuka)
Senzoku de Aishite (専属で愛して) (Yuuya Kanoe)
Shitsuji Gēmu 'Butler game' (執事★ゲーム) (Rau)
Uchi no Tantei Shirimasenka? (ウチの探偵知りませんか?) (Shigure)

Tokusatsu
Kamen Rider × Kamen Rider × Kamen Rider The Movie: Cho-Den-O Trilogy Episode Red (2010) (Piggies Imagin (Third Son) (Voiced by Kazuya Nakai (Eldest Son), Kousuke Toriumi (Second Son)))

Radio
Tetsuya Kakihara is active in the following online anime-related radio programs.

Brave 10 on the radio @ Hibiki Radio Japan starring (Sarutobi Sasuke)
Fairy Tail Web Radio starring (Natsu Dragneel)

Dubbing

Live-action
Admission (Jeremiah Balakian (Nat Wolff))
The Girl in the Spider's Web (Mikael Blomkvist (Sverrir Gudnason))
The Long Way Home (Kim Young-kwang (Yeo Jin-goo))
Looking for Jackie (Zhang Yishan)
Love Island (James McCool)

Animation
Maya the Bee (Sting)
Mune: Guardian of the Moon (Glim's Father)
Playmobil: The Movie (Del)
Thunderbirds Are Go (Gordon Tracy)
A Turtle's Tale: Sammy's Adventures (Ray)

Discography (as a singer)
Kakihara released his debut mini-album, Still on Journey, on 24 November 2010, which is produced by Kiramune Project. His second mini-album, Continuous was released on 15 February 2012, third mini-album, Call Me, was released on 13 March 2013, and fourth mini-album. "ダンディギ・ダン (Dandigi dan)", was released on 30 July 2014. His first single (on the Kiramune label) is called "String of pain", released on 6 February 2013. It is the ending theme song for anime Hakkenden: Eight Dogs of the East in which he also voices the main role of Shino Inuzuka.

He also attended the following live music performances:

Kiramune Music Festival 2010 (aka. Kira Fes), in which a DVD was released on 25 February 2011.
– Track list of Kakihara's Songs (in order of performance)*: 1. my life my time 2. Electric Monster 3. Endless Journey

Kiramune Music Festival 2012, held on 17 & 18 March 2012 in Japan. The DVD was released 24 August 2012.
– Track list of Kakihara's Songs (in order of performance)*: 1.adrenaline 2.Good Luck 3.Chaos Breaker 4.Labyrinth 5.Bible of Heart 6.Hikari 7.thank you & smile 8.Continue

Kiramune Music Festival 2013, held on 13 & 14 April 2013 in Japan. The DVD release will be 6 November 2013.
- Kakihara's Set list: 1.Hands up 2.Cheers!! 3.Call My Name 4.運命の引力 5.String of pain 6.	Eternal screaming

On 2 and 9 September 2012;– he starred as lead singer in Joint Live 'Versus''', a live music event held by Kiramune. Track listing and event report: 
On 7 and 8 September 2013;– he held his first solo live concert, called Kiramune Presents Tetsuya Kakihara First Live Generations.Kiramune Music Festival 2014, held on 22 & 23 March 2014 to celebrate Kiramune's 5th Anniversary. The DVD & BD were released on 24/12/2014.
– Kakihara's Setlist: 1.GENERATIONS 2.ocean flying 3.ラプソディー 4.Labyrinth 5.Number One 6.Call My NameKiramune Music Festival 2015, held on 9 & 10 May 2015.
– Kakihara's Setlist: 1.ダンディギ 2.world in bloom 3.Othello 4.君の声に 5.DEAR MY GIRL 6.咲いちゃいなKiramune Music Festival 2016, held on 4 & 5 June 2016.
– Kakihara's Setlist: 1.咲いちゃいな 2.レッスンAtoB 3.僕さ 4.オレンジ 5.Call My Name 6.monogram 7.進ませろ！Kiramune Music Festival 2016: Kakihara's Setlist: 1.リングオブドランカー 2.Othello 3.ドラマ 4.GENERATIONS 5.ダンディギ 6.オレンジ 7.Start of LIFE

 Singles 

 Mini albums 

Albums

Anime character music CDs/song listing
Listing of anime character songs that have been released on CD as singles or as a track on anime character album(s). Song names in double quotes.

Amnesia (as Shin)
Amnesia Character CD vol 1 "In Your Heart"
Amnesia Crowd Character CD vol 1 "Innumerable kisses"
Angel's Feather (as Kyohei Mitsugi) "Rock Star" – OVA Opening Theme/Duet songB-Project (as Momotaro Onzai)
永久パラダイス "永久パラダイス"
Glory Upper "Glory Upper", "Over the Rainbow" & "永久パラダイス (MooNs Ver.)"
Brand New Star "Brand New Star" & "ラブ☆レボリュ"
鼓動＊アンビシャス "鼓動＊アンビシャス"
星と月のセンテンス "夢見るPOWER"
B-Project: 鼓動＊アンビシャス Volume 3 "magic JOKER"
無敵＊デンジャラス "無敵＊デンジャラス" & "永久パラダイス (14 Vocal Ver.)"
SUMMER MERMAID "SUMMER MERMAID" & "パノラマ"
S級パラダイス WHITE "S級パラダイス" & "PRAY FOR..."
GO AROUND "GO AROUND" & "Movin' on "
快感エブリデイ "快感エブリデイ" & "After all this time"
絶頂＊エモーション "絶頂＊エモーション" & "光と影の時結ぶ"
Brave10 Anime Opening CD (as Sarutobi Sasuke)
Corpse Party Character CD: 男性編 "Whisper of the Nightmare '♂Scorpion♂'" (as Sakutarō Morishige)
Dynasty Warriors series (as Zhu Ran)
"Dynasty Warriors 8 Character Song Album 5: Tales of Bravery" – "Red Passion"
Exorcism of Maria Character Album: gran jubilee vol.3 天の揺り篭編 (as Klaus/Kurausu Eaharuto)
Fairy Tail Series (as Natsu Dragneel)
Character Album Eternal Fellows – Opening Theme Song for "Fairy Tail OVAs"Character Song Collection: Natsu & Gray "Blaze Up"
Character Album 2 "キズナだろー!!" – Opening Theme Song for "Fairy Tail PSP game: Zeref's Awaken"Character Album 2 "いつも全開だ"
Fairy Tail Soundtrack 4 "Blow Away" – Duet Song with GrayHakkenden: Eight Dogs of the East (as Shino)
Character Song Album Vol.1 "Wing in the Darkness"
Image Song CD Vol.1 "無敵のBuddy" – special CD is bundled with Anime 'Hakkenden' Blu-ray Vol. 1 First Press editionImage Song CD Vol.6 "純潔" – special CD is bundled with Anime 'Hakkenden' Blu-ray Vol. 6 First Press editionHoshizora no Komikku Gāden Series (as Kasudisu Koichi)
Theme Song CD "キラキラ〜Looking for my best Friends" – Opening Theme SongCharacter CD Vol.1 POP Caramel "Starring in the Dream"
Character CD Vol.1 POP Caramel "Puzzle"
Houkago wa Gin no Shirabe Character CD: 〜琥珀の調べ〜 和泉悠斗 (as Izumi Yuuto) "Silver Gray"
Love Root Zero (as Kazuya Kuroe)
Best Album 君に捧げるコイゴコロ / Character CD: Kazuya Kuroe "約束するよ"
Best Album 君に捧げるコイゴコロ "Perfect World" – Opening Theme Song for "Love Root Zero kiss kiss Labyrinth (PS2)"Makai Ouji: Devils and Realist – Anime OP/ED CD (as Camio) "Believe My Dice"、"a shadow’s love song"
Minami-ke (as Fujioka)
Character Song Album "桜色ラブレター"
Minami-ke Tadaima Character Song Album "夏色恋風"
Okane ga nai Opening & Ending CD (as Ishii Tetsuo) "愛しい人よ永遠に 温もりを伝えて…" – Ending Theme/Duet songPrince of Tennis Character CD (as Liliadent Krauser) "Dead or Alive"
Princess Princess Character Song: Sweet Suite vol.2 (as Yutaka Mikoto) Cutie Honey
ROOT∞REXX (as Aki Hasumi/Akineko) – PlayStation Vita OP Song: Honey Bunny (Mini Album)
Honey Bunny (Track No.1)
Dear My Girl (Track No.4)
Dear My Girl ~Piano Version~ (Track No.8)
Saint Seiya: The Lost Canvas Character Album (as Pegasus Tenma) "Legend of Us"
Saint Seiya Omega Song Collection (as Dragon Ryūhō) "明日へ吹く風"
Sengoku Paradise Kiwami – Anime Opening CD (as Date Masamune) "リターン乱世独眼竜" – Opening Theme Song in Episodes 1,4,5,8,10 etc ※CD is also bundled with "Sengoku Paradise Kiwami" Vol.2 Anime DVD – as a 'Special CD-DVD Box Set
Tengen Toppa Gurren Lagann Character Album (as Simon) "Breakthrough the Dream" – Duet songTsukiuta. (as You Haduki)
Genau! Solo Character Album "Genau!"(song title & some lyrics are in German) & "夏とキミにおもてなし（原題:夏の思い出）"
El Sol Florecer Solo Character Album "El Sol Florecer"&"真夏のサプライズ！ "
DA☆KAI Duet Character Album "DA☆KAI"
淡い花 Duet Character Album "淡い花"
Hee!Hee!Foo!Foo! Solo Character Album "Hee!Hee!Foo!Foo!" & "君は華麗なる「Laila」" 
ONE CHANCE? Unit CD "ONE CHANCE?"
TSUKIUTA. THE ANIMATION Theme Song CD "LOLV -Lots of Love-" 
TSUKIUTA. THE ANIMATION Vol. 4  "sol~Happy!Phew!~"
TSUKIUTA. THE ANIMATION Vol. 7 "ツキノウタ。 "
Wand of Fortune Character Song Mini Album (as Lagi El Nagil)
"Blazing Guy"
"ウラハラ協奏曲（ラプソディ）"闇☆炎☆土 – Group SongZettai Meikyu Grimm Character Song Concept CD: Vol.1"野イチゴを摘むあかずきん" (as Akazukin)

Anime conventions
Otakon 2012 – 27–29 July 2012 (as voice actor guest) at Baltimore Convention Center (Baltimore, Maryland, USA)

DVD/live events as an idol artist
Ao no Exorcist – Blue Night Fes DVD
"Hate Raji Mezase Hanazono ! Zenkoku hen" (はてラジめざせ花園!全国編) DVD
"Tetsuya Kakihara & Toshiyuki Morikawa's Brave 10 on the radio DVD" – Vol. 1–5
"Tetsuya Kakihara & Yuki Ono's Tottemo Tanoshin jai mashita! (柿原徹也と小野友樹が、とっても楽しんじゃいました!) DVD"
"Kiramune Music Festival 2010 Live" DVD
"Kiramune Music Festival 2012 Live" DVD
"Kiramune Music Festival 2013 Live" DVD
"Kiramune Music Festival 2014 Live" DVD
"Kiramune Music Festival 2015 Live" DVD
"Love Root Zero – Koigokoro Saku Hana" (ラブルートゼロ コイゴコロ咲く花) DVD
"Otomate Party 2009" DVD
"Otomate Party 2010" DVD
"Otomate Party 2012" DVD
"Otomate Party 2013" DVD
"Otomate Party 2014" DVD
"Otomate Party 2015" DVD
"Sengoku Paradise Kiwami" Vol.1 DVD – special content – Daisuke Namikawa and Tetsuya Kakihara's Sekigahara Chin Dochu
Tengen Toppa Gurren Lagann Movie Zenyasai DVD
"Tokimeki Recipe – Spain Ryori no Maki – Tetsuya Kakihara & Takuya Eguchi" DVD

Magazines / idol visual booksSeiyu Paradise vol.9 – 2012 – About Kakihara's new album ContinuousPick-up Voice vol. 51 March 2012 issueSeiyu Grand Prix March 2012 issue – About Behind-the-scenes with shooting of CD cover art of Kakihara's Continuous albumSeiyu Animedia March 2012 issueComic Gene March 2012 issue – Brave 10 Anime Interview with Tetsuya KakiharaTV Station 14 March 2012 issue – Ozuma Anime Interview with Tetsuya KakiharaKiramune Music Festival Official Pamphlet – Released: March 2012Kiramune Special Book Kiramune's music label company 3rd year anniversary publication'' Tetsuya Kakihara – Released: April 2012

References

External links
Official agency profile 
Kiramune profile – Tetsuya Kakihara 

Tetsuya Kakihara  at GamePlaza-Haruka Voice Acting Database 
Tetsuya Kakihara at Hitoshi Doi's Seiyuu Database

1982 births
Living people
Actors from Düsseldorf
Anime singers
German expatriates in Japan
German people of Japanese descent
Japanese male pop singers
Japanese male video game actors
Japanese male voice actors
Lantis (company) artists
21st-century Japanese male actors
21st-century Japanese singers
21st-century Japanese male singers
81 Produce voice actors